Roderick Chisholm (20 December 1868 – 15 April 1912) was a Scottish shipbuilder. He co-designed the RMS Titanic with Thomas Andrews. He died when the Titanic sank on her maiden voyage.

Biography

First years and career
His father, James Chisholm (born in 1832), came from Urray, a village in Ross-shire County and was a master of ships; the mother, Sophia Voaden (born in 1841), was originally from the county of Devon. The couple had married in Devon in 1860 and had eight children: James sr. (1861), Duncan (1863), James jr. (1864), Mary (1866), Roderick, Charlotte (1871), John (1877) and Jessie (1879).

Beginning in 1881, the family lived in the village of Old Kilpatrick, in Dunbartonshire, Scotland; in 1891 he moved to Clydebank. At that time, Roderick became a ship designer and a few years later moved to Belfast, being hired by Harland and Wolff. His skill led him, in the years to come, to the design of the RMS Olympic and Titanic transatlantic.

In 1897, he married Susan Anderson in Lisburn, County Down; the couple had two children: Alice (1897–2002) and James (1899–1960), both born in Belfast.

On the Titanic and posterity
Chisholm was one of the select employees of Harland and Wolff to oversee the smooth running of Titanic maiden voyage.

In the night of 14 April 1912, the Titanic fatally impacted an iceberg sinking hours later; Chisholm died in the sinking. His body, if recovered, was never identified. Its assets amounted to about 140 pounds, of which the widow became beneficiary.

His wife remained at Sandford Avenue, in Pottinger (Belfast) for the rest of her life and died on 22 February 1961 at the age of 87. She is buried in Roselawn Cemetery, Belfast, with her son James. His daughter Alice married in Belfast in 1919 with Alfred McCambley (1894–1976) and died on 11 February 2002 at the age of 104 and she is also buried in the Roselawn Cemetery.

1868 births
1912 deaths
Deaths on the RMS Titanic
People from Dumbarton
Scottish shipbuilders
British naval architects
19th-century Scottish businesspeople